Millie's Daughter is a 1947 American drama film directed by Sidney Salkow, from a screenplay by Edward Huebsch, based on the novel of the same name by Donald Henderson Clarke. The film stars Gladys George, Gay Nelson, and Paul Campbell, and was released on March 20, 1947.

Cast list

 Gladys George as Millie Maitland
 Gay Nelson as Joanna Maitland
 Paul Campbell as Robert Lattimer
 Ruth Donnelly as Helen Reilly
 Norma Varden as Mrs. Sarah Harris
 Arthur Space as Tappie
 Nana Bryant as Mrs. Cooper Austin
 Ethel Griffies as Aunt Katherine
 Harry Hayden as Cummings
 Paul Maxey as Hale
 Robert Emmett Keane as Henry Harris
 Douglas D. Coppin as Escort
 Michael Towne as Escort
 Robert Stevens as Hotel clerk
 Fred Sears as Escort manager
 Nita Bieber as Model
 Dorothy Mathews as Sandra
 Jesse Graves as Black waiter
 Torben Meyer as Mr. Johnson
 Stanley Andrews as Detective
 Leon Lenoir as Alex

References

External links
 
 
 

Columbia Pictures films
Films directed by Sidney Salkow
1947 drama films
1947 films
American drama films
American black-and-white films
1940s English-language films
1940s American films